Uair (Air Euroamerica SA) was an airline based in Montevideo, Uruguay. It operated scheduled regional services to Argentina and Brazil.

History
The airline was established in 2002 started operations in 2003 using two Fokker 100 from TAM. It operated to over ten destinations from its base in Montevideo. The airline ended in 2005 with its planes returned to TAM.

Services
Uair operated the following services:

Domestic scheduled destinations: Montevideo and Punta del Este.
International scheduled destinations: Buenos Aires, Cordoba,  Curitiba, Florianópolis, Mendoza, Porto Alegre, Rosario and Santiago.

Fleet
The Uair fleet consisted of two Fokker 100 aircraft (at January 2005) which belonged to TAM Airlines.

Defunct airlines of Uruguay
Airlines established in 2002
Airlines disestablished in 2005
2002 establishments in Uruguay
2005 disestablishments in Uruguay